Abolqasem Talebi (born 1961) is an Iranian film director and screenwriter. He is a former intelligence officer.

Filmography

Director 
 The Orphanage of Iran - 2016
 The Golden Collars  - 2012 
 Dasthay-e khali  - 2007 
 Arus-e afghan  - 2004 
 Naqmeh  - 2002
 Mr. President  - 2000 
 Bazgasht-e Parastooha (TV series) - 1998 
 Virangar - 1995

Writer
 The Orphanage of Iran - 2016
 The Golden Collars - 2012
 Dasthay-e khali - 2007
 Mr. President - 2000 
 Bazgasht-e Parastooha (TV series) - 1998
 Virangar - 1995

Allegations of sexual misconduct 
In February 2023, the Twitter account affiliated with the MeToo movement in Iran published the story of three people who claimed were sexually harassed by Talebi. Actress   said that during the filming of the The Orphanage of Iran, Talebi asked her to talk about menstruation and sexual intercourse during menstruation. Another person said that Talebi asked her, "You don't know how to turn someone on or you don't know what it is to turn on?" before adding, "You came to take the test and took my time." In another story, it was claimed that women could not bring mobile phones and electronic devices with them when they entered Talebi's office.

See also
Persian cinema

References

External links 
 Talebi on imdb

1961 births
Living people
Iranian film directors
Iranian screenwriters
Film people from Isfahan
People of the Ministry of Intelligence (Iran)